In 1821, Representative-elect John S. Richards (DR), who'd been elected to represent , declined to serve.  A special election was held to fill the resulting, the first of two special elections in the 9th district for the 17th Congress.

Election results

Blair took his seat at the start of the 17th Congress.  Blair himself subsequently resigned May 8, 1822, resulting in a second special election.

See also
List of special elections to the United States House of Representatives

References

South Carolina 1821 09
South Carolina 1821 09
1821 09
South Carolina 09
United States House of Representatives 09
United States House of Representatives 1821 09